Mammals is a play by Amelia Bullmore.  It was first staged at the Bush Theatre, Shepherd's Bush, London, from 6 April to 7 May 2005.  This production then toured the UK in Spring 2006. With a cast of six, including Niamh Cusack, Mark Bonnar and Nancy Carroll.

The playwright was awarded the Susan Smith Blackburn Prize for the work.

Roles

External links
 Past productions: Mammals – from the Bush Theatre website
  – Hannah Knowles's review.

2005 plays
English plays